The Rural Municipality of Laird No. 404 is a rural municipality (RM) in the Canadian province of Saskatchewan within Census Division No. 15 and  Division No. 5.

History 
The RM of Laird No. 404 incorporated as a rural municipality on December 12, 1910.

Demographics 

Geography

Communities and localities 
The following urban municipalities are surrounded by the RM.

Towns
 Hepburn
 Waldheim

Villages
 Laird

The following unincorporated communities are within the RM.

Localities
 Greenfeld
 Mennon

Attractions 
 Fort Carlton
 Hepburn Museum of Wheat
 Petrofka Provincial Recreation Site
 Waldheim Public Museum
 Valley Regional Park

Government 
The RM of Laird No. 404 is governed by an elected municipal council and an appointed administrator that meets on the second Thursday of every month. The reeve of the RM is Terry Knippel while its administrator is Bertha Buhler. The RM's office is located in Waldheim.

Transportation 
 Saskatchewan Highway 12
 Saskatchewan Highway 312
 Saskatchewan Highway 375

See also 
List of rural municipalities in Saskatchewan

References 

Laird

Division No. 15, Saskatchewan